Puyan may refer to the following places:

Iran

 Puyan, Kermanshah ( Pūyān), a village in Horr Rural District, Dinavar District, Sahneh County, Kermanshah Province

Taiwan

 Puyan, Changhua, township in Changhua County